Hatay BŞB İESK is the deaf football section of Hatay Büyükşehir Belediyespor, a major sports club in Hatay, Turkey. The team competes in Turkish Deaf Football Super League.

Previous names
Antakya İESK (2012–2014)
Hatay BŞB İESK (2014–present)

League participations
Turkish Deaf Football Super League: 2014–2016
Turkish Deaf Football First League: 2012–2014, 2016–present

Achievements
 Turkish Deaf Football First League
  Third (1): 2013–2014

League performances

References

External links 

Sport in Antakya
Parasports in Turkey
Deaf sports organizations
Football clubs in Hatay
Deaf culture in Turkey
Sport in Hatay